Richard Glenn Graf (born August 29, 1964) is a former professional American football linebacker who played for eight years in the National Football League for the Miami Dolphins (1987–1990), the Houston Oilers (1991–1992), and the Washington Redskins (1993–1994).

Early life
Graf is the youngest of three sons of Richard and Barbara Graf. He was raised in Madison, Wisconsin.  While attending Madison public schools, he was active in swimming, track and field, hockey, and football. Graf graduated in 1982 from James Madison Memorial High School.

During high school, Graf was an all-state linebacker in football. He also played on the third line for the Madison Memorial hockey team. He also competed in track and field as a sprinter and 110-meter high hurdler.

College career
Graf was recruited to the University of Wisconsin–Madison by Dave McClain. After being red-shirted his first college football season with an ankle injury, he was a four-year starter from 1983–1986.

During the 1985 season, Graf tore his ACL in a game against Northwestern University. This injury ended his season.

Graf returned and played in his senior year.  Despite Wisconsin's 3-9 team record, he was named All-Big Ten linebacker by the coaches and media.

During his collegiate years, Graf participated in two college plays:  the Sound of Music and Antigone. Graf completed his undergraduate degree in communications (B.S. 1987).

Professional career
Graf (6 ft 5 in and 239 lbs.) was drafted in the second round (43rd pick) of the 1987 NFL draft by the Miami Dolphins. He became a starter during his rookie year, the 1987 NFL season.

Graf played for the Miami Dolphins (1986–90), the Houston Oilers (1991–92), and the Washington Redskins (1993–94). He was forced to retire after a severe neck injury suffered in the last pre-season game with the Redskins.

Graf is an active member of the Minnesota Chapter of the National Football League Alumni organization.

In 1988, Graf was named Favorite Son of Madison by the Pen and Mike Club.
In 2003, Graf was made a member of the Madison Sports Hall of Fame.

Graf resides in Edina, Minnesota, and his wife and their three children.

References

1964 births
Living people
American football linebackers
Miami Dolphins players
Houston Oilers players
Washington Redskins players
Wisconsin Badgers football players
Sportspeople from Iowa City, Iowa
Sportspeople from Madison, Wisconsin
Players of American football from Wisconsin